Glenns Ferry is a city in Elmore County, Idaho, United States. The population was 1,319 at the 2010 census.  The city is adjacent to Interstate 84 and the Snake River.

History
Glenns Ferry was one of the most famous and treacherous river crossings on the Oregon Trail. Pioneers forded the Snake River at the Three Island Crossing until 1869, when Gustavus "Gus" Glenn constructed a ferry about two miles upstream, primarily to expedite freight but also for emigrants.  His boat, which could hold two wagons, cut nearly twenty miles from the former route. In 1871 the city of Glenns Ferry was established. Construction of the Oregon Short Line Railroad through the town in 1883 gave the city its first major employer.

Opened in 1971, Three Island Crossing State Park is home to The Oregon Trail History and Education Center, where visitors can learn about pioneer emigrants and Native American history.  The Glenns Ferry community sponsors a crossing commemoration the second Saturday of each August.

The Glenns Ferry townsite was platted  in 1871, just downstream from the ferry site.  It is one of just two incorporated cities in Elmore County, along with Mountain Home.

Geography

Demographics

2010 census
As of the census of 2010, there were 1,319 people, 559 households, and 350 families residing in the city. The racial makeup of the city was 82.2% White, 0.2% African American, 2.0% Native American, 0.4% Asian, 11.8% from other races, and 3.4% from two or more races. Hispanic or Latino of any race were 24.6% of the population.

There were 559 households, of which 27.9% had children under the age of 18 living with them, 48.5% were married couples living together, 10.4% had a female householder with no husband present, 3.8% had a male householder with no wife present, and 37.4% were non-families. 32.6% of all households were made up of individuals, and 18.1% had someone living alone who was 65 years of age or older. The average household size was 2.36 and the average family size was 3.00.

The median age in the city was 42.6 years. 25.6% of residents were under the age of 18; 6.4% were between the ages of 18 and 24; 20.3% were from 25 to 44; 24.8% were from 45 to 64; and 23% were 65 years of age or older. The gender makeup of the city was 49.1% male and 50.9% female.

2000 census
As of the census of 2000, there were 1,611 people, 610 households, and 428 families residing in the city. The racial makeup of the city was 85.41% White, 1.18% Native American, 0.31% Asian, 9.75% from other races, and 3.35% from two or more races. Hispanic or Latino of any race were 26.44% of the population.

There were 610 households, out of which 34.3% had children under the age of 18 living with them, 56.2% were married couples living together, 10.0% had a female householder with no husband present, and 29.7% were non-families. 26.7% of all households were made up of individuals, and 13.4% had someone living alone who was 65 years of age or older.  The average household size was 2.64 and the average family size was 3.21.

In the city, the population was spread out, with 32.4% under the age of 18, 6.3% from 18 to 24, 23.0% from 25 to 44, 21.8% from 45 to 64, and 16.4% who were 65 years of age or older.  The median age was 36 years. For every 100 females, there were 103.2 males.  For every 100 females age 18 and over, there were 93.4 males.

The median income for a household in the city was $26,379, and the median income for a family was $32,019. Males had a median income of $27,321 versus $17,692 for females. The per capita income for the city was $12,869.  About 20.5% of families and 24.5% of the population were below the poverty line, including 38.4% of those under age 18 and 6.3% of those age 65 or over.

Climate

Notable people

Korey Hall, American football player
Kitty Wilkins, horse breeder
Richard Wills, Idaho State Representative

Gallery

References

External links
 Glenns Ferry Chamber of Commerce
 Glenns Ferry School District
 Glenns Ferry High School
 Idaho Parks & Recreation - Three Island Crossing State Park
 Idaho Transportation Dept. - roadside historical marker - Glenns Ferry
 Unofficial Glenns Ferry

Cities in Idaho
Cities in Elmore County, Idaho